The 2016 New Zealand Open Grand Prix Gold was the sixth Grand Prix's badminton tournament of the 2016 BWF Grand Prix and Grand Prix Gold. The tournament was held at the North Shore Events Centre in Auckland, New Zealand on 22–27 March 2016 and had a total purse of $120,000.

Men's singles

Seeds

  Son Wan-Ho (quarterfinals)
  Ajay Jayaram (withdrawn)
  Lee Dong-keun (quarterfinals)
  Hsu Jen-Hao (third round)
  Ihsan Maulana Mustofa (third round)
  Anthony Sinisuka Ginting (third round)
  Jonatan Christie (third round)
  Zulfadli Zulkiffli (withdrawn)
 Nguyen Tien Minh (semifinals)
 Goh Soon Huat (third round)
 Derek Wong Zi Liang (second round)
 Qiao Bin (quarterfinals)
 Huang Yuxiang (champion)
 Wang Tzu-Wei (withdrawn)
 Kazumasa Sakai (second round)
 Soo Teck Zhi  (semifinals)

Finals

Top half

Section 1

Section 2

Section 3

Section 4

Bottom half

Section 5

Section 6

Section 7

Section 8

Women's singles

Seeds

  Sung Ji-Hyun (champion)
  Yui Hashimoto (second round)
  Bae Yeon-ju (semifinals)
  Lindaweni Fanetri (second round)
 Hsu Ya-ching  (quarterfinals)
 Iris Wang (second round)
 Rong Schafer (second round)
 Kaori Imabeppu (quarterfinals)

Finals

Top half

Section 1

Section 2

Bottom half

Section 3

Section 4

Men's doubles

Seeds

  Kim Gi-jung / Kim Sa-rang (quarterfinals)
  Ko Sung-hyun / Shin Baek-cheol (champion)
  Angga Pratama / Ricky Karanda Suwardi (final)
  Markus Fernaldi Gideon / Kevin Sanjaya Sukamuljo (semifinals)
 Goh V Shem / Tan Wee Kiong (withdrawn)
 Manu Attri / B. Sumeeth Reddy (quarterfinals)
 Chen Hung-ling / Wang Chi-lin (quarterfinals)
 Huang Kaixiang / Zheng Siwei (semifinals)

Finals

Top half

Section 1

Section 2

Bottom half

Section 3

Section 4

Women's doubles

Seeds

  Jung Kyung-eun / Shin Seung-chan (quarterfinals)
  Chang Ye-na / Lee So-hee (final)
 Reika Kakiiwa / Miyuki Maeda (withdrawn)
 Jwala Gutta / Ashwini Ponnappa (quarterfinals)

Finals

Top half

Section 1

Section 2

Bottom half

Section 3

Section 4

Mixed doubles

Seeds

 Ko Sung-hyun / Kim Ha-na (semifinals)
 Shin Baek-cheol / Chae Yoo-jung (semifinals)
 Chan Peng Soon / Goh Liu Ying (champion)
 Choi Sol-gyu / Eom Hye-won (first round)
 Vitalij Durkin / Nina Vislova (withdrawn)
 Phillip Chew / Jamie Subandhi (withdrawn)
 Ronan Labar / Emilie Lefel (second round)
 Kim Gi-jung / Shin Seung-chan (first round)

Finals

Top half

Section 1

Section 2

Bottom half

Section 3

Section 4

References

External links 
 Tournament Link

New Zealand Open (badminton)
BWF Grand Prix Gold and Grand Prix
New Zealand Open
New Zealand Open
Sport in Auckland